In set theory, a projection is one of two closely related types of functions or operations, namely:

 A set-theoretic operation typified by the th projection map, written  that takes an element  of the Cartesian product  to the value 
 A function that sends an element  to its equivalence class under a specified equivalence relation  or, equivalently, a surjection from a set to another set. The function from elements to equivalence classes is a surjection, and every surjection corresponds to an equivalence relation under which two elements are equivalent when they have the same image. The result of the mapping is written as  when  is understood, or written as  when it is necessary to make  explicit.

See also

References

Basic concepts in set theory